Punggol Single Member Constituency was a single member constituency in Punggol, Singapore. In 1959, Punggol Constituency was formed when Punggol–Tampines Constituency was split into Punggol Constituency and Tampines Constituency. 

In 1988, part of the constituency was carved out to form Hougang Single Member Constituency. It was also renamed as Punggol Single Member Constituency (SMC) as part of Singapore's political reforms. 

The SMC was merged into Cheng San Group Representation Constituency in 1991.

Member of Parliament

Elections

Elections in the 1980s 

Note: United Front was subsequently renamed into Singapore United Front.

Elections in 1970s

Notes: This election in Punggol is indeed the battle between the then incumbent and the ex-incumbent of the ward.

Elections in 1960s

Elections in 1950s

References

1988 GE's result
1984 GE's result
1980 GE's result
1976 GE's result
1972 GE's result
1968 GE's result
1963 GE's result
1959 GE's result

See also
Punggol East SMC
Pasir Ris–Punggol GRC

Hougang
Sengkang
Punggol